Missulena pruinosa, commonly known as the northern mouse spider, is a species of spider belonging to the family Actinopodidae, native to Australia (Western Australia, Northern Territory).

References

pruinosa
Spiders of Australia
Spiders described in 1966